The Mixed 2×6 km + 2×7.5 km relay competition of the 2015 Winter Universiade was held at the Sporting Centre FIS Štrbské Pleso on January 30.

Results

References 

Mixed